van der Plaats or Vander Plaats is a surname. Notable people with the surname include:

Diana van der Plaats (born 1971), Dutch swimmer
Bob Vander Plaats (born 1963), American politician

Surnames of Dutch origin